Northlake Mall is a shopping mall northeast of Atlanta in the Northlake community of northern DeKalb County, Georgia, United States. The mall was once owned and managed by Simon Property Group - but since February 2016 has been owned by Texas-based ATR Corinth Partners. Anchor store is Macy's (formerly Davison's).

History 

The mall was once owned and managed by Simon Property Group. In 2014, the ownership of the 43-year-old mall was spun-off into a newly formed real estate investment trust, Washington Prime Group, and in 2015, Washington Prime Group completed acquisition of Glimcher Realty Trust - forming WP Glimcher. In February 2016, the mall was sold to Texas-based ATR Corinth Partners.

Anchors 

The sole current anchor store is Macy's (formerly Davison's). Former anchors include JCPenney, Kohl's, and Sears. Kohl's closed in 2016; its location was originally Atlanta's fourth Parisian in 1994, after both Town Center at Cobb and Phipps Plaza in 1992 and Gwinnett Place Mall in 1993. On May 31, 2018, Sears announced that it would be closing its location in September 2018 as part of a plan to close 72 stores nationwide. In October 2019, it was announced that Emory Healthcare will occupy the former Sears building. Emory Healthcare has since converted the building into a mass distribution site for COVID-19 vaccinations, serving as their largest off-site vaccination center. On June 4, 2020, it was announced that JCPenney would be closing on October 18, 2020, as part of a plan to close 154 stores nationwide, which left Macy's as the only anchor store left.

List of anchor stores

Revitalization planning

Tucker Northlake CID Master Plan Study (2015) 

The Tucker-Northlake Community Improvement District (CID) completed its Master Plan for the Tucker and Northlake area in 2015 - serving as the road map for transportation improvements and land use modifications.

Northlake's regional commercial and industrial centers are to be developed into mixed use, walkable destinations.

Plans remains in the works to turn the mall into a mixed-use office, medical and retail/restaurant complex.

References

External links 

Northlake Mall
Sky City: Northlake Mall
The Tucker-Northlake Community Improvement District (CID) 
Tomorrow's News Today - Atlanta

Buildings and structures in DeKalb County, Georgia
Shopping malls established in 1971
1971 establishments in Georgia (U.S. state)
Shopping malls in the Atlanta metropolitan area
Tourist attractions in DeKalb County, Georgia